Malmsbury is a town in central Victoria, Australia on the Old Calder Highway (C794), 95 km north-west of the state capital, Melbourne and  11 km north-west of Kyneton. Situated close by the Coliban River, Malmsbury has a population of 1,101.  Malmsbury is in the north western area of the Shire of Macedon Ranges local government area.

History

The original inhabitants of the local area were the Dja Dja Wurrung people.  European settlement began with squatters raising sheep and cattle.  Gold was discovered in 1858 and the town became a service centre for diggers travelling to Bendigo and Castlemaine. Malmesbury  Post Office opened on 9 November 1854, closed within two months, reopened in 1856, and was renamed Malmsbury around 1896, although the name Malmesbury remains in occasional use.

Malmsbury Reservoir began construction in 1866 and was completed in 1877. The dam wall at Malmsbury was enlarged in 1888 and the addition of steel flood gates in 1939 increased storage further. Deterioration has forced the flood gates to remain open which has reduced the capacity of the reservoir to pre-1939 levels.

The last of Victoria's early pioneers, James Thornton who came with John Batman to Melbourne in 1836 operated public houses for thirty years until the early 1890s. 

Edward Davy, who invented the electric relay, making long-distance telegraphy possible, was mayor of Malmsbury three times in the mid-nineteenth century.

The Town Today

The Malmsbury area is known for its deposits of bluestone, used in the construction of notable buildings both locally and throughout the state. The town also houses the Malmsbury Youth Justice Centre, a custodial centre for young adult males aged 18–21 deemed too vulnerable for adult prison. On 25 January 2017, there was a riot at the Youth Justice Centre which involved 30 inmates, 15 of these inmates escaped the premises. 8 of these escapees were arrested shortly after however, the other 7 fled the area in stolen cars. Witnesses reported vehicles travelling at high speed through the Castlemaine area and footage was recorded of offenders stealing petrol from a service station.

Malmsbury has a railway station on the Melbourne to Bendigo railway line. The Malmsbury Viaduct  is a large masonry arch rail bridge constructed over the Coliban River in 1859 and is classified "A" by the National Trust. The town's school uses the viaduct as its emblem. A stretch of the Calder Freeway (M79) bypassing Malmsbury was officially opened on 12 April 2008, and the removal of heavy through traffic was celebrated eight days later by the holding of a "Monster Street Party" in the town.

Since the Calder Freeway bypass construction, Malmsbury has gained a reputation as a getaway destination for tourists across the country. During this period several restaurants have opened up in the town such as Small Holdings, The Moto Bean Cafe and the resurgent Mill once again under new ownership. Each of these new destinations complements the older establishments such as the Malmsbury Bakery.

In December 2019, Malmsbury had its pharmacy opened to serve the local community in Malmsbury and its surroundings.

References

External links

Macedon Ranges Shire Council - Official site
Visit Victoria: Malmsbury - Official Government tourism site.
Geoscience Australia place names search: Malmsbury

Towns in Victoria (Australia)
Shire of Macedon Ranges
Mining towns in Victoria (Australia)